The Parc des Buttes Chaumont is a public park situated in northeastern Paris, France, in the 19th arrondissement. Occupying  , it is the fifth-largest park in Paris, after the Bois de Vincennes, Bois de Boulogne, Parc de la Villette and Tuileries Garden.

Opened in 1867, late in the regime of Napoleon III, it was built according to plans by Jean-Charles Adolphe Alphand, who created all the major parks demanded by the Emperor. The most famous feature of the park is the Temple de la Sibylle, inspired by the Temple of Vesta in Tivoli, Italy, and perched at the top of a cliff fifty metres above the waters of the artificial lake.

History

The park took its name from the bleak hill which occupied the site, which, because of the chemical composition of its soil, was almost bare of vegetation – it was called Chauve-mont, or bare hill. The area, just outside the limits of Paris until the mid-19th century,  had a sinister reputation; it was the site of the Gibbet of Montfaucon, the notorious place where from the 13th century until 1760, the bodies of hanged criminals were displayed after their executions.  After the 1789 Revolution, it became a refuse dump, and then a place for cutting up horse carcasses and a depository for sewage. The director of public works of Paris and builder of the Park, Jean-Charles Adolphe Alphand, reported that "the site spread infectious emanations not only to the neighboring areas, but, following the direction of the wind, over the entire city."

Another part of the site was a former gypsum and limestone quarry mined for the construction of buildings in Paris and in the United States. This raw material was used for a long time to produce plaster and lime. In order to make lime, gypsum was heated in furnaces. This activity was maintained until the second half of the 19th century. By the end of the 1850s, the quarry was exhausted. That quarry also yielded Eocene mammal fossils, including Palaeotherium, which were studied by Georges Cuvier. This not-very-promising site was chosen by Baron Haussmann, the Prefet of Paris,  for the site of a new public park for the recreation and pleasure of the rapidly growing population of the new 19th and 20th arrondissements of Paris, which had been annexed to the city in 1860.

The work on the park began in 1864, under the direction of Alphand, who used all the experience and lessons he had learned in making the Bois de Boulogne and the Bois de Vincennes. Two years were required simply to terrace the land. Then a railroad track was laid to bring in cars carrying two hundred thousand cubic meters of topsoil. A thousand workers remade the landscape,  digging a lake and shaping the lawns and hillsides. Explosives were used to sculpt the buttes themselves and the former quarry into a picturesque mountain fifty meters high with cliffs, an interior grotto, pinnacles and arches. Hydraulic pumps were installed to lift the water from the canal of the Ourcq River up the highest point on the promontory, to create a dramatic waterfall.

The chief gardener of Paris, horticulturist Jean-Pierre Barillet-Deschamps, then went to work, planting thousands of trees, shrubs and flowers, along with creating sloping lawns. At the same time, the city's chief architect, Gabriel Davioud, designed the miniature Roman temple on the top of the promontory, modeled after that at Tivoli near Rome, as well as belvederes, restaurants modeled after Swiss chalets, and gatehouses like rustic cottages, completing the imaginary landscape. The park opened on 1 April 1867, coinciding with the opening of the Paris Universal Exposition, and becoming an instant popular success with the Parisians.

Features of the park

The lake and the Île du Belvédère
The heart of the park is an artificial lake of  surrounding the Île de la Belvédère, a rocky island with steep cliffs made from the old gypsum quarry.  On the top is the Temple de la Sibylle,  fifty meters above the lake.  The island is connected by two bridges with the rest of the park. the island is surrounded by paths, and a steep stairway of 173 steps leads from the top of the belvedere down through the grotto to the edge of the lake.

The Temple de la Sibylle
The most famous feature of the park is the Temple de la Sibylle, a miniature version of the famous ancient Roman Temple of Vesta in Tivoli, Italy.  The original temple was the subject of many romantic landscape paintings from the 17th to the 19th century, and inspired similar architectural follies in the English landscape garden of the 18th century. The temple was designed by Gabriel Davioud, the city architect for Paris, who designed picturesque monuments for the Bois de Boulogne, Bois de Vincennes, Parc Monceau, and other city parks.  He also designed some of the most famous fountains of Paris, including the Fontaine Saint-Michel. The temple was finished in 1867.

The grotto and waterfalls
The grotto is a vestige of the old gypsum and limestone quarry that occupied part of the site, now adjacent to rue Botzaris on the south side of the park.  It is fourteen meters wide and twenty meters high, and has been sculpted and decorated with artificial stalactites as long as eight meters to make it resemble a natural grotto, in the style of the romantic English landscape garden  of the 18th and 19th century.  An artificial waterfall, fed by pumps, cascades from the top of the cave and down through the grotto to the lake.

The bridges

A 63-meter-long suspension bridge, eight meters above the lake,  allows access to the belvedere. The bridge was designed by Gustave Eiffel, the creator of the Eiffel Tower.

After a series of well-publicized suicides, the bridge is now fenced with wire mesh.

Architecture
Most of the architecture of the park, from the Temple de la Sibylle, the cafes, and gatehouses to the fences and rain shelters, was designed by Gabriel Davioud, chief architect for the city of Paris. He created a picturesque, rustic style for the parks of Paris, sometimes inspired by ancient Rome, sometimes by the chalets and bridges of the Swiss Alps. 

The main entrance to the park is at Place Armand-Carrel, where stands the mairie (town hall) of the 19th arrondissement, also designed by Davioud. There are five other large gates to the park — Porte Bolivar, Porte de la Villette, Porte Secrétan, Porte de Crimée, and Porte Fessart — and seven smaller gates.

As of 2019, the park hosts three restaurants (Pavillon du Lac, Pavillon Puebla, and Rosa Bonheur), two reception halls, two Guignol theatres, and two waffle stands. The two Guignol theatres were established in 1892.

The park has four Wi-Fi zones as part of a citywide wireless Internet-access plan.

Flora

The park was envisioned by Napoleon III as a garden showcase, a vision that continue to guide the park's direction. Currently, there are more than 47 species of plants, trees, and shrubs cultivated in the park.  Many of the plants and trees found in the park were those originally planted when the park was created.

The park boasts many varieties of indigenous and exotic trees (many of which are Asian species): in particular, several cedars of Lebanon planted in 1880, Himalayan cedars, Ginkgo Biloba, Byzantine hazelnuts, Siberian elms, European hollies, and bamboo-leafed prickly ashes, among many others.

Tree species found in the park include:

 Oriental Plane
 Hackberry
 Ornamental Pears
 Ginkgos
 Common Alder
 European Beech
 Giant Sequoia
 European Black Pine
 Large-leaved Linden
 Tulip Tree

Metro stations

The Parc des Buttes Chaumont is served by Lines 5 and 7bis

Culture
In September, the park hosts Paris's annual Silhouette Short Film Festival. The Silhouette Festival features seven days of French and international short films, followed by an awards ceremony.

In 2008, a modern version of the traditional Guinguette, Rosa Bonheur, was established inside the park.  This unique restaurant and dance venue is government-sponsored by the Mairie of the 19th arrondissement.

Eric Rohmer shot parts of his movie The Aviator’s Wife in the park.

References

 
Hedi Slimane (2002). Interview for Index Magazine.

Notes and citations

External links

Paris Office of Tourism: Parc des Buttes Chaumont 
Les Parc des Buttes Chaumont – current photographs and of the years 1900 
High Resolution Travel Photographs of Parc des Buttes Chaumont – current high resolution photographs 
Theatre Guignol Anatole official site 
Le Guignol de Paris 
Parc des Buttes Chaumont 
Rosa Bonheur – website of the restaurant in the park

19th arrondissement of Paris
Buttes Chaumont, Parc des